The Ministry of Social Development of Chile is an entity created during the first presidency of Sebastián Piñera (2006−2010), who replaced the Ministry of Planning (1990−2011).

Its current minister is Giorgio Jackson.

List of representatives

References

External Link
 

Government ministries of Chile